Alessandro Lopane (born 9 April 2004), is an Australian professional footballer who plays as an attacking midfielder for Western Sydney Wanderers.

References

External links

Living people
2004 births
Australian soccer players
Association football forwards
Sydney Olympic FC players
Western Sydney Wanderers FC players
A-League Men players
National Premier Leagues players
Australian people of Italian descent